The 2020–21 Old Dominion Monarchs women’s basketball team represented Old Dominion University during the 2020–21 NCAA Division I women's basketball season. The team was led by first-year head coach DeLisha Milton-Jones, and played their home games at the Chartway Arena in Norfolk, Virginia as a member of Conference USA.

Schedule and results

|-
!colspan=12 style=|Non-conference regular season

|-
!colspan=12 style=|C-USA regular season

|-
!colspan=12 style=| C-USA Tournament

See also
 2020–21 Old Dominion Monarchs men's basketball team

Notes

References

Old Dominion Monarchs women's basketball seasons
Old Dominion
Old Dominion Lady Monarchs basketball team
Old Dominion Lady Monarchs basketball team